Justin Michael Herold (born January 11, 1991) is an American professional basketball player for Iwate Big Bulls in Japan.

References

External links
Sonoma State bio

1991 births
Living people
American expatriate basketball people in Argentina
American expatriate basketball people in Japan
American men's basketball players
Basketball players from California
Cyberdyne Ibaraki Robots players
Iwate Big Bulls players
Junior college men's basketball players in the United States
Otsuka Corporation Alphas players
Sonoma State Seawolves men's basketball players
Sportspeople from Santa Rosa, California
Yokohama Excellence players
Unión de Santa Fe basketball players
Power forwards (basketball)